3380 or variant, may refer to:

In general
 A.D. 3380, a year in the 4th millennium CE
 3380 BC, a year in the 4th millennium BCE
 3380, a number in the 3000 (number) range

Other uses
 3380 Awaji, an asteroid in the Asteroid Belt, the 3380th asteroid registered
 Kentucky Route 3380, a state highway
 Texas Farm to Market Road 3380, a state highway
 IBM 3380, a hard disk drive unit

See also